Adversus omnes haereses may refer to:

The work On the Detection and Overthrow of the So-Called Gnosis by Irenaeus, usual Latin title Adversus Haereses
A work by Pseudo-Tertullian
A lost work by Gennadius of Massilia